The Royal School of Needlework (RSN) is a hand embroidery school in the United Kingdom, founded in 1872 and based at Hampton Court Palace since 1987.

History
The RSN began as the School of Art Needlework in 1872, founded by Lady Victoria Welby. The first President was Princess Christian of Schleswig-Holstein, Queen Victoria's third daughter, known to the RSN as Princess Helena. She received help from William Morris and many of his friends in the Arts and Crafts movement. The School received its royal prefix in March 1875 when Queen Victoria consented to become its first patron. It was also an inspiration to Dora Wemyss, who founded the Wemyss School of Needlework in Scotland in its image. The word "Art" was dropped from the school's title in 1922.

Its initial premises was a small apartment on Sloane Street, employing 20 women. The school had grown to 150 students, moving in 1903 to Exhibition Road, near the Victoria and Albert Museum. The purpose-built building was designed by a group of architects, including prominent British Arts and Crafts architect James Leonard Williams (d.1926).

The RSN established a Studio which works new bespoke embroidery commissions and replicas of antique textiles as well as restoration and conservation projects. The work of the Studio has been used in many important events, including a joint effort with Toye in producing the velvet cushions on which the Royal Crowns were carried into Westminster Abbey for the Coronation of King George VI.

In 1953, the School created the gold embroidery on the Purple Robe of Estate, part of the coronation robes of Queen Elizabeth II.

The school moved from Princes Gate in Kensington to Hampton Court Palace in 1987, occupying rooms in Christopher Wren's construction.

In 2011, the school was responsible for hand appliquéing machine-made floral lace motifs onto silk net (tulle) for the wedding dress of Kate Middleton, now Her Royal Highness The Princess of Wales.

In 2022, the school celebrated its 150-year anniversary with the 150 Years of the Royal School of Needlework: Crown to Catwalk exhibition at the Fashion and Textile Museum of London.

Alumni include
 Beryl Dean, Disruptive embroiderer
Louisa Pesel

Publications
As part of the Arts and Crafts movement's efforts to make arts and crafts more accessible to a wider audience, in 1880 the school published the Handbook of Embroidery. Over a century later, in 2011, the school reprinted the work with a preface essay by Lynn Hulse.

William George Paulson Townsend, who taught drawing and became master of design at the school, also published several works including Embroidery, or, The craft of the needle and Plant and floral studies for designers, art students, and craftsmen, the latter of which was reprinted in 2005.

Collections
The RSN has an archive of over 30,000 embroidery-related images covering every period of British history. There are also over 5,000 textile pieces in its Collection, including lace, silkwork, whitework, Jacobean embroidery and many other forms of embroidery and needlework.

For its 150th anniversary in 2021, the Royal School of Needlework opened the RSN Stitch Bank, a digital archive with detailed information about selected stitches, their history and usage.

Governance
The Royal School of Needlework is a registered charity and has always been under royal patronage. The current patron, as of January 2017, is the Duchess of Cornwall. The previous patron was Queen Elizabeth II. The school is governed by a board of trustees currently chaired by Andrew Palmer. Dr Susan Kay-Williams is Chief Executive. Standards are overseen by QAA who, in 2014, commended the quality of student learning opportunities at the school.

Allegations of bullying 
On 23 April 2022, The Telegraph reported that a former student had made accusations that management at the Royal School of Needlework had failed to properly investigate allegations of bullying made by her and another student on the Future Tutor Programme against the same tutor. According to the article, a prior complaint against the tutor had previously been upheld by the school and the tutor reprimanded; however, when the tutor was later allowed to teach the same student who had made the complaint against him, she alleges that the pattern of bullying behaviour was repeated. Dr Kay-Williams, Chief Executive of The Royal School of Needlework, denied failing to properly investigate, said that it "is the role of the tutor to develop and challenge the students", and stated that the consensus of the staff who had worked with the student was that she "lacked the required focus  and commitment for the course".

Current facilities
The RSN runs leisure classes from one to five days starting with classes for beginners and leading on to more complex and varied techniques as embroiderers become more experienced. There is a Certificate and Diploma in technical hand embroidery for those who want to develop practical embroidery skills to a high level; also a unique Degree in hand embroidery which encompasses some technical training, with the emphasis on contemporary practice, alongside academic studies. The degree course in hand embroidery is accredited by the University for the Creative Arts. In 2012 the RSN introduced a new three-year Tutors’ Course which combines high-level technical embroidery training with teaching practice and business skills required to work as a freelance embroiderer/tutor.

See also
Mary Ann Beinecke Decorative Art Collection

References

External links

English embroidery
Educational institutions established in 1872
Charities based in London
1872 establishments in the United Kingdom
Hampton Court Palace
Art schools in London
University for the Creative Arts